Santa Bárbara de Casa (pop. 1,237, 2004 census) is a town in Spain, in the county of Huelva.  It lies 80 km from Huelva.

History
It was reconquered from the Moors by Alfonso X, and passed to the noble family of Guzmán.    The area was surveyed on December 5, 1550, and the town was called Santa Barvola.  In 1643, the town was sacked by the Portuguese.  The area suffered depopulation but recovered in the 18th century.  It was renamed in 1916, Casa being the name of a stream near the town.

Notes

External links
  Santa Bárbara de casa
 SANTA BARBARA DE CASA

Municipalities in the Province of Huelva